Dulwich Hill, is a semi-professional football club, based and located in the Dulwich Hill area of New South Wales. In season 2023, they are set to compete in the Football NSW League One Mens competition and Boys Youth League 2.

The club has strong ties to the Portuguese community with particular emphasis on the island of Madeira.

Dulwich Hill was originally established by migrants from the island of Madeira who had settled in the inner west.

Dulwich Hill has a strong rivalry with Fraser Park who are also of Portuguese heritage and have a very strong Portuguese derby when they play.

Senior Team History

Club colours 
The club colours are blue and yellow.

Honours

References

External links 
Dulwich Hill FC Website
NPL 3 Competition Website

Soccer clubs in Sydney